Elections to Inverclyde Council were held on 3 May 2007 the same day as the Scottish Parliament general election. The election was the first one using six new wards created as a result of the Local Governance (Scotland) Act 2004; each ward will elect three or four councillors using the single transferable vote system, a form of proportional representation. The new wards replace 20 single-member wards which used the plurality (first past the post) system of election.

Results

Ward results

Changes since 2007 election
† On 27 November 2008 Inverclyde North Cllr Charles McCallum resigned from the Labour Party and now sits as an Independent.
† In February 2011, Argyll News reported that Inverclyde West Councillor George White was a former Liberal Democrat who had recently joined the Liberal Party.

By-elections since 2007 election
A by-election was held following the death of Councillor Ken Ferguson MSP of the Scottish National Party on 26 April 2009. The seat was held by the SNP's Innes Nelson on 18 June 2009.

References

2007
2007 Scottish local elections